Recovery is the third album by Scottish Celtic rock band Runrig, released in 1981. The album deals with the social history of the Scottish Gàidhealtachd, mirroring a renewed sense of cultural and political identity within the Scottish Gaelic community.

Two of the tracks which was originally recorded on this album, were re-recorded and released on Proterra. These tracks were An Dubh and The Old Boys.

Track listing 
 "An Toll Dubh" (The Dungeon) - 1:35
 "Rubh nan Cudaigean" (Cuddy Point) - 2:55
 "'Ic Iain 'Ic Sheumais" (Son of John, Son of James) - 6:07
 "Recovery" - 5:52
 "Instrumental" - 4:02
 "'S tu Mo Leannan" (You Are My Love) / Nightfall on Marsco - 2:54
 "Breaking the Chains" - 1:54
 "Fuaim a' Bhlàir" (The Noise of Battle) - 4:55
 "Tìr an Airm" (Land of the Army) - 4:05
 "The Old Boys" - 4:53
 "Dust" - 5:30

Personnel
Runrig
 Donnie Munro - vocals
 Rory MacDonald - bass guitar, vocals
 Calum MacDonald - percussion, vocals
 Malcolm Jones - guitars, bass, accordion, pipes, vocals
 Iain Bayne - drums, percussion

External links
 Discographical entry

1981 albums
Runrig albums
Scottish Gaelic music
Concept albums